Billy Purvis may refer to two different musicians and performers from Tyneside, England:

 Billy Purvis (1832), a blind street entertainer
 Billy Purvis (1853), a traveling showman and piper